Jacob George Gratton (born 5 January 2002) is an English professional footballer currently playing as a midfielder for Farsley Celtic.

Club career
Gratton was born in Rotherham and joined his boyhood club Rotherham United at the age of nine. His first experience of first-team football came in January 2020, when he joined Scarborough Athletic on a youth loan. A cruciate injury in early February kept him on the sidelines for a year, returning in  February 2021. In August 2021 he joined Guiseley on loan, returning in January 2022. During this loan spell, he was given permission to be part of the Rotherham United squad for the EFL Trophy, and made his club debut as a substitute in the 6–0 win against Doncaster Rovers on 7 September 2021. He joined Farsley Celtic on loan in February 2022, helping them avoid relegation. Gratton was released by Rotherham at the end of the 2021–22 season.

Career statistics

Club
.

Notes

References

2002 births
Living people
English footballers
Association football midfielders
National League (English football) players
Rotherham United F.C. players
Guiseley A.F.C. players
Scarborough Athletic F.C. players
Farsley Celtic F.C. players